Thomas John Williams (10 February 1935 – 25 August 1967) born in Battersea, London, was an English professional footballer who played as a winger.

Career
He played in Football League for Colchester and Watford. Williams also played in non-league football for Carshalton Athletic and Gravesend & Northfleet.

References

External links
 
 Tommy Williams at Colchester United Archive Database

1935 births
1967 deaths
Footballers from Battersea
English footballers
Association football midfielders
Carshalton Athletic F.C. players
Colchester United F.C. players
Watford F.C. players
Ebbsfleet United F.C. players